Beaver County may refer to the following places:

Canada
 Beaver County, Alberta

United States
 Beaver County, Oklahoma 
 Beaver County, Pennsylvania 
 Beaver County, Utah